Buqajeh may refer to:
 Buqajeh-ye Bala
 Buqajeh-ye Pain